Bagmati is a Rural Municipality in Lalitpur District in Bagmati Province of Nepal that was established in 2017 by merging the former Village development committees Ashrang, Ghusel, Malta, Bhattedanda, Pyutar, Ikudol and Gimdi in March 2017. The center of this rural municipality is located in Old-Bhattedanda.

Demographics
At the time of the 2011 Nepal census, Bagmati Rural Municipality had a population of 13,049. Of these, 58.3% spoke Tamang, 40.2% Nepali, 0.9% Magar, 0.2% Maithili, 0.1% Bhojpuri and 0.3% other languages as their first language.

In terms of ethnicity/caste, 58.6% were Tamang, 23.2% Hill Brahmin, 7.3% Chhetri, 5.9% Magar, 1.9% Kami, 1.4% Ghale, 0.5% Damai/Dholi, 0.3% Brahmu/Baramo and 0.9% others.

In terms of religion, 59.3% were Buddhist, 39.5% Hindu, 1.1% Christian and 0.1% others.

References

Rural municipalities in Lalitpur District, Nepal
Rural municipalities of Nepal established in 2017